Joplin and Wall Avenues Historic District is a national historic district located at Joplin, Jasper County, Missouri.   The district encompasses 11 contributing buildings in the central business district of Joplin.  It developed between about 1900 and 1939 and includes representative examples of Renaissance Revival and Late Gothic Revival style architecture. Located in the district is the previously listed Joplin Supply Company. Other notable buildings include the U. S. Court House and Post Office (1904), Cosgrove Building (1913), Independent Building (c. 1910), Hurlbut Chapel (c. 1920), and Crown/Greyhound Bus depot (1936).

It was listed on the National Register of Historic Places in 2010.

References

Historic districts on the National Register of Historic Places in Missouri
Renaissance Revival architecture in Missouri
Gothic Revival architecture in Missouri
Buildings and structures in Joplin, Missouri
National Register of Historic Places in Jasper County, Missouri